Claricord is a brand name of an adjustable strap worn around the neck to support the weight of a clarinet.

Notes

Clarinets